Păltinişu may refer to:

 Păltinișu, a village in Perieți Commune, Ialomița County, Romania
 Păltinișu, a village in Căzănești Commune, Mehedinți County, Romania

See also 
 Paltin (disambiguation)
 Păltiniș (disambiguation)